Nepal Police Flying Squad was an elite squad of Nepal Police, consisting of about a dozen well trained police officers, selected by the then IGP Khadgajeet Baral himself for the prevention of criminal activities in the Kathmandu Valley.

Nepal Police Flying Squad consisted of 12 elite efficient police officers to augment police response with quick reaction mobile team to attend major incidents in the Kathmandu Valley.

References

Specialist law enforcement agencies of Nepal
1975 establishments in Nepal